Coy Branch is a stream in Randolph County in the U.S. state of Missouri. It is a tributary of Coon Creek.

Coy Branch has the name of a pioneer citizen.

See also
List of rivers of Missouri

References

Rivers of Randolph County, Missouri
Rivers of Missouri